Salesi Tu'ipulotu "Charles" Piutau (born 31 October 1991) is a New Zealand rugby union player. He plays in the fullback (and occasionally wing) position for England club Bristol Bears in the Premiership, and formerly for New Zealand's national team the All Blacks.

Early life
Piutau was born in New Zealand, from Tongan parents. He grew up on the Auckland suburb of Mangere and attended Wesley College. He is the youngest of 10 children.

Rugby playing career

Junior level
In 2010, Piutau represented Tonga at the IRB Junior World Championship in Argentina. Piutau was the top try scorer for the New Zealand Under-20s in their 2011 World Championship winning campaign.

Charles played club rugby for Pakuranga United Rugby Club. He is the younger brother of Bristol Bears centre Siale Piutau.

Club career
Piutau made his debut for Auckland in 2010. He was brought into the Blues squad in 2012 and confirmed as fullback in 2014.

On 1 April 2015, it was announced Piutau would join Irish club Ulster from the start of the 2016–17 season.

Piutau signed for English club Wasps in the Aviva Premiership during the 2015–16 season. During his season at Wasps, Piutau had a strong impact. He scored a try in the 80th minute against Exeter Chiefs in the European Rugby Champions Cup quarter-final to help Wasps reach the semi-final. Piutau was nominated for the Aviva Premiership Player of the Season and was named in the Team of the Season.

In August 2017, Ulster confirmed that Piutau would be leaving the province at the end of the 2017–18 Pro14 season to join Bristol Bears.

International career
Piutau joined the All Blacks training squad during the 2013 Super Rugby season. On 22 June, he made his test debut against France in New Plymouth. He was not selected for the 2015 World Cup, a factor in his decision to move to play club rugby in Europe.

Test Match Record 

Pld = Games Played, W = Games Won, D = Games Drawn, L = Games Lost, T = Tries Scored, Con = Conversions, Pen = Penalties, DG = Drop Goals, Pts = Points Scored

Personal life
Piutau married in July 2018.

Piutau has invested in multiple houses in Auckland New Zealand, Singapore, Australia and the United Kingdom.

References

External links 
 
 Charles Piutau | Rugby Database Profile
 
 Auckland player profile

Living people
1991 births
Auckland rugby union players
Blues (Super Rugby) players
Bristol Bears players
Expatriate rugby union players in Northern Ireland
People educated at Wesley College, Auckland
People from Māngere
Rugby union fullbacks
Rugby union wings
Rugby union players from Auckland
Tonga international rugby union players
Ulster Rugby players
New Zealand expatriate rugby union players
New Zealand expatriate sportspeople in England
New Zealand international rugby union players
New Zealand international rugby sevens players
New Zealand sportspeople of Tongan descent
New Zealand rugby union players
Wasps RFC players
New Zealand expatriate sportspeople in Northern Ireland